Anna "Annie" Johanna Geertruida Maria Borckink (born 17 October 1951) is a former speed skater from the Netherlands, who represented her native country at the 1980 Winter Olympics in Lake Placid, United States. She won the gold medal in the women's 1500 metres event, with Dutch teammate Ria Visser winning the silver medal. For her performance, Borckink was named Dutch Sportswoman of the year. After retiring from skating she runs a sporting goods store in Dronten.

Personal bests:
500 m – 43.3 (1977)
1000 m – 1:25.60 (1980)
1500 m – 2:10.95 (1980)
3000 m – 4:41.75 (1981)

References

1951 births
Speed skaters at the 1976 Winter Olympics
Speed skaters at the 1980 Winter Olympics
Olympic speed skaters of the Netherlands
Olympic medalists in speed skating
Olympic gold medalists for the Netherlands
Dutch female speed skaters
People from Berkelland
Sportspeople from Gelderland
Living people

Medalists at the 1980 Winter Olympics
21st-century Dutch women
20th-century Dutch women